Vint is a Russian card-game, similar to both bridge and whist and it is sometimes referred to as Russian whist. Vint means a screw in Russian, and the name is given to the game because the four players, each in turn, propose, bid and overbid each other until one, having bid higher than the others care to follow, makes the trump, and his vis-a-vis plays as his partner.

The game spread to Finland, where it evolved into Skruuvi, which features also a kitty and misère contracts.

Description of vint

Vint has many similarities to rubber bridge: The cards have the same rank. The score of tricks is entered under the line, and points for slam, honors, and penalties for undertricks above the line. The bidding is similar to bridge, one bids the number of tricks and the trump suit or no trump.

During the progress of the bidding and declaring, opportunity is taken by the players to indicate by their calls their strength in the various suits and the high cards they hold, so that, when the playing begins, the position of the best cards and the strength of the different hands can often be fairly accurately estimated.

Unlike Bridge, in Vint there is no dummy, all taken tricks count toward a game (that is, the tricks taken by the defenders as well as the tricks taken by the declarer side including overtricks, regardless of whether the contract was made or not), and the bidding ends after eight consecutive passes (everyone passes twice including the player who made the last bid.) The value of a trick depends on the level of the contract. In higher contracts the value of a trick is higher.

The card play follows the standard whist formula. One must follow suit, but if unable to do so, one can play any card. The trick is won by the highest trump, if there are trumps in the trick, otherwise by the highest card of the suit led. The winner of the trick starts the next one.

Points are awarded also for honours. In a no trump declaration aces count only as honors; in a suit declaration both the aces and the five next highest cards.

Development

The game emerged during the latter half of the 19th century. In primitive forms, known as Siberian Vint, the value of the trick depended on the level of the contract and the trump suit. Later, this was simplified so that the level of the contract was the only thing the value of the trick depended on.

Towards the end of the 19th century, the kitty was added to the game. The highest bidder took a kitty of 4 cards to his hand and gave one card for every other player before the card play started. Towards the end of the 19th century, also the card exchange mechanism used in Skruuvi was born. The highest bidder took the kitty in his hand, gave 4 cards for his partner, who, in turn, gave one card for every other player. This enabled the declarer side to arrange themselves very shaped hands, which lead to higher contracts.

The first rule book for bridge, dated 1886, was Biritch, or Russian Whist written by John Collinson, an English financier working in Ottoman Constantinople (now Istanbul). It and his subsequent letter to The Saturday Review dated May 28, 1906, document the origin of Biritch as being the Russian community in Constantinople. The word biritch is thought to be a transliteration of the Russian word Бирюч (бирчий, бирич), an occupation of a herald or announcer.

There are references to Vint in classical Russian literature, notably in the short stories of Anton Chekhov, and in Cancer Ward by Aleksandr Solzhenitsyn. The composer Tchaikovsky was a very enthusiastic player.

Skruuvi

Skruuvi is a Finnish variant of Vint, and it became common in Finland while it was a part of Russia. The rules of Skruuvi diverged slowly from Vint, and the rules were codified in the 1940s in the books Skruuviopas by the pseudonym O.L. and Uusi täydellinen skruuvipelin ohjekirja by the pseudonym E.N. Maalari. Skruuvi is still played in Finland as a niche hobby whereas Vint is not played in Russia. Helsingin Suomalainen Klubi still organizes annual Toro Skruuvi tournament in honour of Arvo Ylppö, an enthusiastic Skruuvi player.

Skruuvi uses a bidding system similar to bridge, but the emphasis of the bidding system is more in signifying individual high cards, similar to slam-investigating cue bids in bridge.

Differences from vint

In Skruuvi, as described by E.N. Maalari, there is a kitty of four cards that the declarer side gets after bidding, and the game involves some exchange of cards so that everyone ends up with 13 cards. After the exchange of cards, the bidding continues, but only the members of the declarer side are allowed to participate in bidding. The trick-taking play occurs after this second bidding round.

In addition to the Vint-style scoring, the declarer side gets a bonus for a made contract that depends on the level of the contract. In Skruuvi, the non-declarer side may also double by knocking on the table before the card play starts.

It is also possible to bid misääri, a contract where the aim is to avoid tricks. In a round-pass situation a forced misääri is played.

Since the exchange of cards favours the declarer side, final contracts in Skruuvi are rather high, at a level of four or higher. In some circles undoubled contracts of four odd tricks, and sometimes also undoubled contracts of five odd tricks, are judged made without playing out the hand.

After a rubber has been played in Skruuvi, four end games (called Kotka) are played without a kitty. In the end games the bidding starts at a level of six (small slam level), and the exchange of cards favours highly the declarer side.

A typical skruuvi night consists of three matches, where a match consists of a rubber of ordinary skruuvi and four kotkas. Between the matches, the seats are changed so that everyone plays as a partner of everyone else. The partnerships may be temporarily broken if the players make certain special bids, bolshevik or mussolini. In these contracts the declarer plays alone against everyone else, in bolshevik a grand slam misääri, and in mussolini a grand slam no trump.

Later developments

The scoring system of the classical Skruuvi, as played in the first half of the 20th century, was notoriously complicated, with scoring for games, made contracts, taken tricks (or avoided tricks in misääri), various honours, penalties for failed contracts, penalties for aces taken in tricks during a misääri contract and, of course, special scoring for bolshevik and mussolini.

Since the 1950s, at Helsingin Suomalainen Klubi, the scoring system has been streamlined. Bonuses for honors and the concept of playing a rubber have been dropped altogether. A match consists of four hands of ordinary skruuvi, four hands of kotkas and four hands of bolsheviks. According to earlier rules, it was possible to bid a bolshevik, but the club rules made it mandatory for everyone to bid bolshevik once during a twelve-hand match.  Only slam contracts and doubled contracts are actually played out, and other contracts are judged made without actual card play.

Another modern variant consists of eight hands, four hands of ordinary skruuvi and four hands of kotkas. Points are awarded only for made contracts, avoided tricks in forced misääri, and penalties for undertricks and penalties for taken aces in misääri. In this variant, all the hands are played out, but the minimum allowed final contract is five odd tricks.

Famous players
 Minna Canth
 Arvo Ylppö

References

Attribution:

Further reading
 
 The rules of Vint at www.korttipelit.net (Finnish)
 The rules of Skruuvi at www.korttipelit.net (Finnish)
 Maalari, E.N., Uusi täydellinen skruuvipelin ohjekirja, Hämeenlinna 1944
 Kurki-Suonio, Ilmo, MMM Korttipelikirja, Otava 1962, contains the rules of Skruuvi in Finnish.
 Scarne, John, Scarne's Encyclopedia of Card Games, contains the rules of Vint in English.
 Taskinen, Hannu et al., "Skruuvin tarkoitus", from Muusan kuiskaus (ed. Inkeri Näätsaari), Enostone, 2004
 Taskinen, Hannu (ed.), Skruuvi, Enostone, 2004

19th-century card games
Auction Whist group
Russian card games
French deck card games